Microdrillia pakaurangia is an extinct species of sea snail, a marine gastropod mollusk in the family Borsoniidae.

Description

Distribution
This extinct marine species is endemic to New Zealand, found at Pakaurangi Point, Kaipara

References

 Powell A.W.B., 1942,  The New Zealand Recent and fossil Mollusca of the family Turridae : with general notes on turrid nomenclature and systematics. Bulletin of the Auckland Institute and Museum, 2: 1–188
 Maxwell, P.A. (2009). Cenozoic Mollusca. pp 232–254 in Gordon, D.P. (ed.) New Zealand inventory of biodiversity. Volume one. Kingdom Animalia: Radiata, Lophotrochozoa, Deuterostomia. Canterbury University Press, Christchurch.

External links
  Bouchet P., Kantor Yu.I., Sysoev A. & Puillandre N. (2011) A new operational classification of the Conoidea. Journal of Molluscan Studies 77: 273–308
 National Paleontological Collection Database: Microdrillia pakaurangia

pakaurangia
Gastropods of New Zealand
Gastropods described in 1942